Erling Svend Konrad Michelsen (24 May 1899 – 19 September 1976) was a Norwegian sport wrestler. He was born in Lilleaker and represented the club Lilleaker IF. He competed at the 1924 Summer Olympics, in Greco-Roman wrestling, the lightweight class.

References

External links
 

1899 births
1976 deaths
Sportspeople from Oslo
Olympic wrestlers of Norway
Wrestlers at the 1924 Summer Olympics
Norwegian male sport wrestlers